The Venucia M50V is a compact MPV and mini MPV produced by Chinese auto maker Venucia, a subsidiary of Dongfeng Motor Co., Ltd.

Overview

The Venucia M50V debuted on the 2017 Shanghai Auto Show in April 2017 and was launched on the Chinese car market in late 2017 as Venucia's first entry into the MPV market. The M50V shares its underpinnings with the Dongfeng Fengguang 360 MPV while being positioned slightly upmarket than the Fengguang 360 with prices starting from 65,800 yuan to 84,900 yuan.

References

External links

Venucia M50V website

M50V
Compact MPVs
Cars introduced in 2016
Front-wheel-drive vehicles
2010s cars
Minivans
Cars of China